The  is a Japanese DC commuter electric multiple unit (EMU) train type operated by the Tokyo subway operator Tokyo Metro on Tokyo Metro Hibiya Line and Tobu Skytree Line inter-running services. Introduced into service on 25 March 2017, a total of 44 seven-car sets were built by Kinki Sharyo between 2016 and 2020 to replace the 03 series fleet.

Overview
A total of 44 seven-car 13000 series trains (294 vehicles) are scheduled to replace the 03 series EMUs used on Tokyo Metro Hibiya Line and Tobu Skytree Line inter-running services. A unified door arrangement with four pairs per side instead of the mixture of three and five pairs per side on the 03 series trains allows the platform edge doors to be installed at Tokyo Metro Hibiya Line stations once the older train fleets have been replaced. The trains use permanent-magnet synchronous motors, offering 25% energy savings compared to the motors used in earlier 03 series trains.

Formation
Each car is motored, with only the outer axle on each bogie motored.

Car 4 has two single-arm pantographs, and cars 2 and 6 each have one.

Interior
Internally, the trains use LED lighting throughout. Three 17-inch LCD passenger information displays are provided above each doorway, with information given in four languages (Japanese, Chinese, English, Korean). Areas for wheelchairs and pushchairs are provided at one end of each car.

History

Tokyo Metro announced its plans to introduce a new fleet of trains with 20 m long cars and four sets of doors per side on each car in April 2014, jointly with Tobu Railway. Details of the new 13000 series trains on order were officially announced on 17 June 2015, together with details of the Tobu 70000 series to be introduced around the same time. The entire fleet of 44 trains (308 vehicles) is scheduled to be delivered between fiscal 2016 and fiscal 2020.

The trains entered full revenue service on 25 March 2017.

Build histories
The delivery dates for the fleet are as shown below.

Notes

References

External links

 Official press release 
 Kinki Sharyo press release 

Electric multiple units of Japan
13000 series
Train-related introductions in 2016
Kinki Sharyo multiple units
1500 V DC multiple units of Japan